Lawrence County School District may refer to:
 Lawrence County Schools, Alabama
 Lawrence County School District (Arkansas)
 Lawrence County School District (Mississippi)